The Speedway Grand Prix of Croatia was a motorcycle speedway event that was a part of the Speedway Grand Prix Series.

Results

References

See also 
 Speedway Grand Prix

 
Grand Prix
Croatia
Recurring sporting events established in 2010
2010 establishments in Croatia
Sport in Međimurje County